Nova Mutum Esporte Clube, or Nova Mutum, as they are usually called, is a Brazilian football team from Nova Mutum in Mato Grosso, founded on 10 September 1988.

History
Founded in 1988, the club only joined the Federação Matogrossense de Futebol in 2019, and started playing in the year's second division. In September, the club achieved promotion to the first division of the Campeonato Mato-Grossense as champions, after defeating Poconé 6–2 on aggregate.

In the 2020 Mato-Grossense, their debut in the first division, Nova Mutum won the title by defeating União Rondonópolis 2–0 on aggregate. With the accolade, the club also qualified to the 2021 Campeonato Brasileiro Série D, the 2021 Copa Verde and the 2021 Copa do Brasil.

Honours
 Campeonato Mato-Grossense
 Winners (1): 2020

 Copa FMF
 Winners (1): 2022

 Campeonato Mato-Grossense Second Division
 Winners (1): 2019

References

External links
  
 Soccerway team profile

1988 establishments in Brazil
Association football clubs established in 1988
Football clubs in Mato Grosso